The 1921 Holy Cross football team was an American football team that represented the College of the Holy Cross as an independent during the 1921 college football season.  In its third season under head coach Cleo A. O'Donnell, the team compiled a 5–3 record. The team played its home games at Fitton Field in Worcester, Massachusetts.

Schedule

References

Holy Cross
Holy Cross Crusaders football seasons
Holy Cross football